Finnegan, Henderson, Farabow, Garrett & Dunner LLP, commonly known as  Finnegan, is an international intellectual property law firm based in Washington, DC, United States. Finnegan was founded on March 1, 1965, by Marc Finnegan and Douglas Henderson in Washington, DC. It is one of the largest law firms focusing exclusively on the practice of intellectual property (IP) law, practicing all aspects of patent, trademark, copyright, and trade secret law, including counseling, prosecution, licensing, and litigation. Finnegan (known as Finnegan Europe LLP in the United Kingdom  and the Fei Han Foreign Affairs Law Firm in Taiwan ), also represents clients on IP issues related to U.S. and European patents and trademarks, international trade, portfolio management, the Internet, e-commerce, government contracts, antitrust, and unfair competition.

As a place to work, Finnegan has been identified by Working Mother magazine as a top 100 company for working mothers since 2011.

Offices
 Atlanta, GA
 Boston, MA
 London, UK
 Munich, Germany
 Palo Alto, CA
 Reston, VA
 Seoul, Korea
 Shanghai, China
 Taipei, Taiwan
 Tokyo, Japan
 Washington, DC

Reputation  
Finnegan has been consistently ranked one of the most prestigious law firms for intellectual property in the world. As such, Finnegan is among the most competitive firms for incoming associates, who usually possess advanced degrees in engineering and science in addition to a law degree. In 2019, the firm employed more than 40 former U.S. Federal Circuit clerks.

Chosen as “U.S. Specialty Firm of the Year,” 2016, 2018, 2020 (Managing Intellectual Property Americas IP Awards)
Awarded “U.S. Post-Grant Firm of the Year,” 2020 (Law Business Research Global IP Awards)
Ranked #1 in six out of seven IP categories, more than any other law firm. (The Legal 500, 2019)
Ranked as a Tier 1 law firm in more than a dozen U.S. and international IP categories. (IAM Patent 1000, 2019)
Named “D.C. Intellectual Property Litigation Department of the Year” (The National Law Journal, 2018, 2019)
Named "U.S. PTAB Firm of the Year" (Managing Intellectual Property, 2019)
Named “Intellectual Property Boutique Firm of the Year” (LMG Life Sciences Awards, 2019)
Named “Practice Group of the Year” in Intellectual Property (Law360, 2017, 2019)
“Law Firm of the Year—Trademark,” 2019 (U.S. News—Best Lawyers Best Law Firms)

References

External links
 

Patent law firms
Intellectual property law firms
Law firms based in Washington, D.C.
Law firms established in 1965